Nezha (نزهة) is a feminine given name of Arabic origin, often used in the Maghreb. Different forms and spellings exist : Naziha, Naze'eha, Neziha, Nouzha, Nazha, Nezihat, Nuzhat, Nuzhah, Nuzha, etc... The origin of this name is نزه and نزاهة, which mean honesty, virtuousness, righteousness, moral excellence and integrity. It may also refer to innocence, chastity and purity. When it is pronounced Nuzha, Nozha or Nouzha, it means a promenade, a pleasant walk in a garden or any floral environment.

People named Nezha 
 Nezha Alaoui, Moroccan entrepreneur
 Nezha Aït Baba, Moroccan footballer
 Nezha Bidouane (born 1969), Moroccan hurdler
 Nezha Chekrouni (born 1955), Moroccan politician
 Nezha Regragui, Moroccan actress
 Princess Lalla Nuzha of Morocco (1940–1977), Moroccan princess

As a surname 
 Laura Nezha, Albanian singer, actress, and director

Arabic feminine given names